Glenostictia pictifrons is a species of sand wasp in the family Crabronidae. It is found in North America. It is known to be a predator of Neorhynchocephalus volaticus.

References

Crabronidae
Articles created by Qbugbot
Insects described in 1856
Hymenoptera of North America